Peng Xiaoran (born 3 December 1990) is a Chinese actress and host. She is best known for her breakout role in the 2019 hit web-drama Goodbye My Princess.

Filmography

Film

Television series

Variety show

Awards and nominations

References 

Chinese film actresses
Chinese television actresses
1990 births
Living people
21st-century Chinese actresses
Actresses from Beijing